Scorchers is a 1991 ensemble drama written and directed by David Beaird with a cast of Faye Dunaway, James Earl Jones, Denholm Elliott, Leland Crooke and Emily Lloyd. The film is based on David Beaird's 1985 stage play of the same name which premiered at the Equity Waiver Theater in Los Angeles, also featuring Leland Crooke in the cast.

Plot 
Scorchers takes place in Cajun Louisiana on the wedding night of a young woman named Splendid (played by Emily Lloyd). Splendid is scared to death of what will happen in the bedroom with her new husband Dolan (James Wilder) and her father, Jumper (Leland Crooke), finds himself having to coax his daughter to submit to the groom.

Meanwhile, Talbot (Jennifer Tilly) comes to terms with the fact that her husband has not been satisfied at home and has been cheating on her, as the town prostitute, Thais (Faye Dunaway) shares her wisdom on the ways of men—all this takes place while the town bartender, Bear (James Earl Jones) and the town drunk, Howler (Denholm Elliott), debate the finer points of music and life.

Cast 
Faye Dunaway as Thais
James Earl Jones as Bear
Denholm Elliott as Howler
Leland Crooke as Jumper
Emily Lloyd as Splendid
Jennifer Tilly as Talbot
James Wilder as Dolan
Luke Perry as Ray Ray
Anthony Geary as Preacher
Kevin Michael Brown as Sugar Cat
Michael Covert as Pie Boy
Saxon Trainor as Renee
Patrick Warburton as Balford

Soundtrack

Home media 
The DVD was released by Trinity Home Entertainment in January 2005, but in full screen and without any bonus material. However, the DVD does have an opening monologue by Leland Crooke that was absent from the original VHS release.

References

External links

1991 films
Films directed by David Beaird
American comedy-drama films
Films set in Louisiana
Films scored by Carter Burwell
Goldcrest Films films
American films based on plays
1991 comedy-drama films
1990s English-language films
1990s American films